Isocrotonic acid (also known as quartenylic acid; formally named (Z)-2-butenoic acid) is the cis isomer of crotonic acid.  It is an oil, possessing a smell similar to that of brown sugar.  It boils at 171.9 °C, concomitant with conversion into crotonic acid.  Isomerization is complete when the cis acid is heated to 170–180 °C in a sealed tube.

Rudolph Fittig and Hugo Erdmann showed that the γ-phenyl structural analog of isocrotonic acid forms α-naphthol when dehydrated, an observation that provided useful evidence in understanding the nature of naphthalene.

(Z)-(C6H5)CH=CHCH2COOH   →   α-naphthol   +   H2O

References 

Enoic acids